Daddy Good Deeds (Traditional Chinese : 當旺爸爸) is a Hong Kong television comedy serial produced by TVB starring Ha Yu, Linda Chung and Steven Ma as the main leads, with Evergreen Mak, Nancy Wu, Edwin Siu, Cilla Kung, and Chow Chung in major supporting cast. Filming and post- production took place in the autumn of 2011 and the premiere episode aired on 19 March 2012. This was producer Mui Siu-ching's last series for TVB after being with the station for 25 years.

This is the fifth for Steven Ma pairs up with Linda Chung where they have both partnered in the previous four TVB series, Virtues of Harmony II, A Journey Called Life, A Watchdog's Tale and Ghost Writer. This is also the last TVB drama for Steven Ma because his contract with TVB ended in 2012.

Synopsis
Ko Yi-man (Ha Yu) is the owner of a pawn shop and a devoted father to his son Ko Wai-ting (Evergreen Mak) 2nd daughter Ko Yu-chu (Linda Chung) and younger daughter Ko Yu-po (Cilla Kung). However, unknown to the trio, one of them is an abandoned child, the symbolic "collateral" in a good luck ritual made many years previously. When the receipt for the transaction comes to light, first speculation about the truth, and then the truth itself, threatens the family that he has given everything for and Ko Yi-man must fight to keep his family together.

Cast

The Ko family

The Lam family

Tak Kwong Pawn Brokers

Other casts

Viewership ratings

Note
Week 3 – The ratings during the prime time hours dropped due to the Easter holiday.

Trivia
The drama contain many references to past TVB series produced by Mui Siu Ching such as the Forensic Heroes franchise, Can't Buy Me Love, Beyond the Realm of Conscience and Fathers and Sons to name a few.

External links
Official Site

References

TVB dramas
2012 Hong Kong television series debuts
2012 Hong Kong television series endings